USSR in Construction was a journal published in the decade of 1930 to 1941, as well as briefly in 1949, in the Soviet Union. It became an artistic gem and counter-current in the first year of socialist realism. With elements such as oversized pages and multi-page fold-outs, each issue exists as an elaborate artistic creation. The first issue of the journal was edited by Maxim Gorky. 

The journal was published in Russian, French, English, German, and, from 1938, Spanish. The journal informed readers abroad of the hyper-construction taking place within the nation, and portrayed the emergence of the Soviet Union as a leading industrial power. The self-proclaimed purpose of the magazine was to "reflect in photography the whole scope and variety of the construction work now going on the USSR”. By focusing on a single theme or initiative in each issue, the contributing artists produced a work which effectively conveyed the heroic efforts of the Soviet people in fulfilling the objectives set forth by Joseph Stalin to transform the technologically deficient country into a highly developed and productive world power. The first issues of USSR in Construction tended to focus upon large state projects, particularly those related to industrialization. The scope of the journal quickly expanded, however, with later issues focusing on different ethnic republics and regions, various building projects, new transportation routes, and themes of daily life such as children, the arts, and athletics, in addition to special political issues.

The journal was published over the course of eleven years and brought together articles by esteemed writers such as Alexander Fadeyev, Isaac Babel, and Sergei Tretyakov, with montages composed from images created by the Soviet Union's most talented photo-journalists: Max Alpert, Arkady Shaikhet, Georgii Zelma, Boris Ignatovich, Semion Fridland, and George Petrusov. El Lissitzky and Sophie Lissitzky-Küppers designed the overall layout and cover arrangements for a number of issues, as did Alexander Rodchenko and his wife, Varvara Stepanova.

USSR in Construction first appeared not long after Stalin's denunciations of Constructivism as a bourgeois art form and the official proclamation of socialist realism as the only acceptable style of art. Many avant-garde artists thus turned to photomontage as an alternative mode of expression which could side-step around the rigid restrictions being put on painting. The last issue of the journal was published in December 1949. The magazine was succeeded by another one, Soviet Union, which was launched in March 1950. Japanese illustrated propaganda magazine Front was modeled on USSR in Construction.

Editorial board
Apart from Gorky, the official chief editors in the 1930s were Georgy Pyatakov, Valery Mezhlak, Alexander Kosarev. The de facto editor-in-chief of the magazine in the late 1930s was Evgenia Khayutina, the wife of Nikolai Yezhov.

The first composition of the editorial board included Mikhail Koltsov, Fedor Konar, Artemy Khalatov and Semyon Uritsky . Separate issues were published under the editorship of Alexander Rodchenko, El Lissitzky and other editorial staff. The main artist was Nikolai Stepanovich Troshin.

See also
History of the Soviet Union (1927–1953)
Propaganda in the Soviet Union
Photomontage

References

External links
 Some images
 USSR in Construction A digital presentation by the University of Saskatchewan of several full issues of the journal.

Magazines established in 1931
Magazines disestablished in 1949
Magazines published in the Soviet Union
Multilingual magazines
Communist magazines
State media
Propaganda newspapers and magazines
Magazines published in Moscow
Monthly magazines published in Russia